Epiprineae is a tribe of plants of the family Euphorbiaceae. It comprises 2 subtribes and 9 genera.

See also
 Taxonomy of the Euphorbiaceae

References

 
Euphorbiaceae tribes